Kapóng is a Cariban language spoken mainly in Guyana, most commonly in the region of the Upper Mazaruni. Though many speakers do not live in villages, there are a number of population centers, notably Kamarang, Jawalla, Waramadong, and Kako. There are two dialects, Akawaio and Patamona.

The Macushi name of the language is Ingarikó.

History 
The Carib tribes practice an indigenous system of beliefs, one that dates back to the 16th century. It was not until the 19th century that attempts were made to understand the beliefs and practices of this tribe. Much of the Kapóng language refers back to sun worship and sun spirits, which is reflective of the beliefs system of these Carib-speaking tribes. Literature has also found belief in a higher being in the sky among the Carib tribes in Guyana.

Geographic Distribution
The Kapóng language is found to be spoken in lowland tropical South America, particularly in the countries of Guyana, Brazil, and Venezuela. 

In Guyana, Kapóng is spoken in forests by the Mazaruni River Basin. In 2013, a survey by the Inter-American Development Bank identified 20% fluency among Akawaio, which was the highest fluency rate among all sampled  indigenous groups in Guyana. However, no indigenous language was in use by the Guyanese Patamona people in the survey.

The number of speakers in Brazil is about 10,000, and the transmission of language in Brazil is deemed to be of good standing. Speakers in Brazil are found in the Roraima Indigenous Terra Raposa. 

In Venezuela, Kapóng is spoken in the states of Bolivar and Monagas.

Dialects/Varieties
Kapóng has three dialects, which are:
 Akawaio (Akawayo)
 Ingarikó (Ingaricó)
 Patamona

Phonology

Consonants 

The allophones of /k s n/ are [ʔ tʃ ŋ], as well as the allophones of /z/ being [ʃ ʒ dʒ].

Vowels

Orthography

Vowels and diphthongs 
 a - [a]
 e - [ɛ/e]
 i - [i]
 ï - [ɨ]
 o - [o/ɔ]
 ö - [ʌ]
 u - [u]
 ai - [aj]
 au - [aw]
 ei - [ej]
 oi - [ɔj]

Consonants 
 b - [b]
 ch - [t͡ʃ]
 d - [d]
 g - [g]
 j - [d͡ʒ] ~ [ʒ]
 k - [k]
 m - [m]
 n - [n]
 ñ - [ɲ]
 ng - [ŋ]
 p - [p]
 r - [ɺ]
 s - [s]
 sh - [ʃ]
 t - [t]
 w - [w]
 y - [j]
 z - [z]
 ' - [ʔ]

Vocabulary
Much of the Kapóng language has emphasis on a higher spirit/god up in the sky, and this is reflected in the vocabulary in this language.

 Kapóng = Sky People
 akwalo = the spirit
 akwa = God's place
 Waica = warrior
 Taemogoli = grandfather
 Kapo = in the sky
 Iopotari akuru = chief spirit

Morphology 
yamok (aemvk) is an ending used to make words plural. (i.e.) Adding yamok to "Kapong" makes "Kapong" plural; Kapong yamok.

-da  is a marker used to mark possession. (i.e.) kaata = book;    da kaata = my book.

The word preferred word order of Kapóng is subject-object-verb, for example:

However, the word order is flexible and there are cases where the object precedes the subject in sentences. Such as:

There are no gender distinctions found in Kapóng, as there are no differences in personal pronoun systems and affixes to indicate genders of nouns.

Similes are often used in writing, as many words in this language allow this to occur. Through the use of suffixes, many words can be converted into similes. Examples are as follows:
 -kasa = 'like'
 -walai = 'similar to'

References

External links 
 http://www.language-museum.com/encyclopedia/a/akawaio.php
 http://www.endangeredlanguages.com/lang/668/guide
 http://www.native-languages.org/akawaio.htm

Languages of Guyana
Languages of Venezuela
Cariban languages